Ežen Kolčevská (also written as Ezhen Kolchevskaia; born 31 July 31 1995 in Chelyabinsk) is a Czech curler.

Career
Kolčevská played in her first World Women's Curling Championships in 2017 at the 2017 World Women's Curling Championship. There, the finished with a 5-6 record. At the 2017 Euros, they finished with a 3-6 record, qualifying once again for the World Championship. At the 2018 Ford World Women's Curling Championship, the Czech team qualified for the playoffs for the first time with a 6-6 record. They then lost the qualification game 7-3 to Russia's Victoria Moiseeva. The 2018 Europeans were not successful for the Czech's as they did not qualify for the World Championship. The following season, they would qualify for the Worlds, after going 3–6 at the 2019 European Curling Championships. The 2020 World Women's Curling Championship was cancelled due to the COVID-19 pandemic, but the team represented Czech Republic at the 2021 World Women's Curling Championship which was played in a bio-secure "bubble" to prevent spread of the virus. There, they finished in twelfth place with a 3–10 record.

Personal life
As of 2020, she is employed as a barista.

Teams

References

External links

Kolčevská Ežen (CC SOKOL LIBOC) - Player statistics (all games with his/her participation) - Czech Curling Association

Kubešková returns to world stage in Saint John - Curling Canada – 2014 Ford World Women's Curling Championship
Video: 

Living people
1995 births
Czech female curlers
Czech curling champions
Competitors at the 2019 Winter Universiade
Sportspeople from Chelyabinsk
Russian emigrants to the Czech Republic